Kildrummie railway station served the village of Cawdor, Highland, Scotland, from 1855 to 1858 on the Inverness and Nairn Railway.

History 
The station was opened as Cawdor on 1 December 1855 by the Inverness and Nairn Railway. Its name was changed to Kildrummie on 1 January 1857. It was a short-lived station, only being open for just over two years, closing on 1 January 1858, although it was still in the timetable for the rest of January of the same year. It continued as a private platform for the Earl of Cawdor and its name was changed to Kildrummie Platform. This continued until 1880.

References 

Disused railway stations in Ross and Cromarty
Railway stations in Great Britain opened in 1855
Railway stations in Great Britain closed in 1858
1855 establishments in Scotland
1858 disestablishments in Scotland